Glen Eugene Stephens (January 20, 1933 – April 27, 2019) was an American professional baseball outfielder who played in Major League Baseball (MLB) for all or portions of a dozen seasons between 1952 and 1964 for the Boston Red Sox, Baltimore Orioles, Kansas City Athletics and Chicago White Sox. He also played one season in Nippon Professional Baseball (NPB) for the Chunichi Dragons (1966). He attended the University of Arkansas.

Biography 
Stephens signed with the Red Sox in 1951. But Stephens found himself playing behind Boston's entrenched outfield of Baseball Hall of Famer Ted Williams, Gold Glove-winner Jim Piersall and future American League Most Valuable Player Jackie Jensen. Even though he filled in at all three outfield positions, from 1955 until he was traded to the Orioles on June 9, 1960, he was Williams' primary replacement as Boston's left fielder, and was nicknamed "Williams' caddy."

On June 18, 1953, Stephens became the first major leaguer in the modern era (since 1900) to have three hits in a single inning.  The record was matched by Johnny Damon on June 27, 2003, who coincidentally accomplished this feat as a Red Sox as well.

In his 12 big-league seasons, he played in 964 games and had 1,913 at bats, 283 runs, 460 hits, 78 doubles, 15 triples, 37 home runs, 207 RBI, 27 stolen bases, 233 walks, .240 batting average, .325 on-base percentage, .355 slugging percentage, 679 total bases and 17 sacrifice hits.

Stephens concluded his professional career in 1967 after 17 seasons; he died April 27, 2019, in Granbury, Texas, at the age of 86.

References

Sources
, or Retrosheet
Venezuelan Professional Baseball League statistics

1933 births
2019 deaths
Albany Senators players
American expatriate baseball players in Japan
Atlanta Crackers players
Baseball players from Arkansas
Baltimore Orioles players
Boston Red Sox players
Chicago White Sox players
Chunichi Dragons players
Columbus Jets players
High Point-Thomasville Hi-Toms players
Indianapolis Indians players
Kansas City Athletics players
Louisville Colonels (minor league) players
Major League Baseball left fielders
Patriotas de Venezuela players
People from Gravette, Arkansas
Santa Marta (baseball club) players
Syracuse Chiefs players
Tacoma Cubs players